Johannes Scotus or Skotus, John Scotus, or John the Scot may refer to:

 John Scotus Eriugena (c. 815–877), Irish theologian, philosopher, and poet
 John Scotus (bishop of Mecklenburg) (c. 990–1066)
 John Scotus (bishop of Dunkeld) (died 1203), Bishop of St Andrews and Dunkeld
 John of Scotland, Earl of Huntingdon (c. 1207–1237)
 Duns Scotus (c. 1266–1308), philosopher and theologian